The Kuala Lumpur Convention Centre, also known as the KL Convention Centre, is a convention and exhibition centre located in the Kuala Lumpur City Centre (KLCC) development in Kuala Lumpur, Malaysia.

The convention centre was the 2015 recipient of the AIPC innovation award.

During the COVID-19 pandemic, it was used as a mass vaccination centre.

Description

The building was designed with Modernist and Postmodern architectural elements, and is located near the Kuala Lumpur City Centre Park.

Major past events at the Convention Centre
67th MDA/FDI International Dental Convention & Trade Exhibition 2010 (2200 delegates)
XVIII FIGO World Congress of Gynecology and Obstetrics (FIGO) (8,294 delegates), 2006
12th APLAR Congress Of Rheumatology 2006 (2,026 delegates)
6th Asian & Oceanian Epilepsy Congress 2006 (1,000 delegates) 
The 11th ASEAN Summit 2005
3rd International Asia Pacific Society of Infection Control (APSIC) 2007
Scientific Excellence in Islamic Civilisation Exhibition 2007
39th ASEAN Ministerial Meeting 2007
16th World Congress on Information Technology 2008
13th International Congress of Infectious Diseases 2008
My Fair Lady the Musical 2007
Chicago the Musical 2007
Beauty and the Beast the Musical 2008
Comic Fiesta (annually)
68th MDA/FDI International Dental Convention & Trade Exhibition 2010 (2500 delegates)
6th World Chambers Congress (3–5 June 2009, 1,000 delegates)
Stem Cells and Immunity Conference (1–3 October 2009, 700 delegates)
Asia Pacific Digestive Week (19–22 September 2010, 1,500 delegates)
International Greentech & Eco Products Exhibition & Conference Malaysia (14–17 October 2010)
10th International Conference on Low Vision (VISION 2011) (21–24 February 2011, 3,000 delegates)
18th Asian Pacific Congress of Cardiology (7–10 April 2011, 2,000 delegates)
22nd Pacific Science Congress (13–17 June 2011)
The 2nd International Greentech & Eco Products Exhibition & Conference Malaysia (14–17 October 2010)
Asia's No.1 Water and Wastewater Industry Event (27–29 March 2012)
102nd Rotary International Conference (3,000 Delegates)
2013 Global Entrepreneurship Summit (11–12 October 2013)
EAGE/FESM Joint Regional Conference Petrophysics Meets Geoscience (17–18 February 2014)
IECEX 2014 - February 2014
2015 Global Round of the World Scholar's Cup (3000 participants)
2015, 128th IOC Session, where the IOC elected the host city of the 2022 Winter Olympics
Ed Sheeran -  x Tour (16 March 2015)
5 Seconds of Summer - Sounds Live Feels Live World Tour (2 March 2016)
2018 Global Round of the World Scholar's Cup (4100 participants)
Mariah Carey -  Number 1's Tour (16 October 2018)
Why Don't We -  8 Letters World Tour (14 November 2019)
The Kuala Lumpur Summit 2019 (18–21 December 2019)
COVID-19 vaccination location for Kuala Lumpur region

Economic Impact 
Since its opening in June 2005, through to 31 March 2017, the Centre has hosted over 12,276 events, bringing into Kuala Lumpur over 20.9 million delegates and visitors. Of these delegates and visitors, 7% were international/regional.

See also
 List of concert hall in Malaysia
 List of convention and exhibition centers
 
 Malaysia International Trade and Exhibition Centre (MITEC)

References

External links

Convention centres in Kuala Lumpur
Tourist attractions in Kuala Lumpur
2005 establishments in Malaysia
Commercial buildings completed in 2005
Modernist architecture in Malaysia
Postmodern architecture in Malaysia